The Honourable Major General Alexander Leslie (1731 – 27 December 1794) was a major general in the British Army during the American Revolutionary War. He was the commander of the British troops at the Battle of Harlem Heights. He replaced Cornwallis as commander in the South in 1782.

Early life
Leslie was born in England in 1731 to Alexander Leslie, 5th Earl of Leven and, his second wife, Elizabeth Monypenny, daughter of  David Monypenny of Pitmilly. From his father's first marriage to Mary Erskine, he had an elder half-brother, David Melville, 6th Earl of Leven. From his parents marriage, he had three sisters, the novelist Lady Mary Hamilton (wife of Dr. James Walker and George Robinson Hamilton), Anne Carnegie, Countess of Northesk (wife of George Carnegie, 6th Earl of Northesk), and Elizabeth Hope, Countess of Hopetoun (wife of John Hope, 2nd Earl of Hopetoun). His paternal grandfather was David Leslie, 3rd Earl of Leven.

Career 
He enlisted in the 3rd Foot Guards of the British Army in 1753. He was promoted to lieutenant-colonel of the 64th Regiment of Foot in 1766.

In 1775, before the American War of Independence broke out, he led troops to Salem, Massachusetts looking for contraband weapons.  His advance was delayed by a standoff at a bridge, during which the colonists removed the weapons he was looking for.  His force was eventually allowed to proceed, but found nothing of consequence, and was received with hostility during the expedition.

In 1776, Leslie was promoted to brigadier-general.  He fought in the Battle of Long Island, the Landing at Kip's Bay, the Battle of White Plains and the Battle of Harlem Heights, the Battle of Princeton and the Siege of Charleston during the American War of Independence. At Princeton, his nephew, Captain William Leslie was mortally wounded.

In 1780, he was sent to the Chesapeake Bay by Sir Henry Clinton in order to "make a powerful diversion in [Earl Cornwallis's] favor by striking at the magazines then collecting by the enemy ... for supplying the army they were assembling to oppose him." He became major general in 1782 and was made Colonel of the 63rd (West Suffolk) Regiment of Foot the same year. He transferred in 1788 to be Colonel of the 9th (East Norfolk) Regiment of Foot to his death.

Personal life 
In 1760, he married Mary Tullidelph, a daughter of Dr. Walter Tullidelph of Tullidelph, in the County of Forfar, who had been a planter and member of the Council of the Island of Antigua.  She died in 1761 in childbirth. Their daughter survived:

 Mary Ann Leslie (1761–1845), who married John Rutherfurd, MP for Roxburghshire and eldest surviving son of John Rutherfurd.

On 27 December 1794, Leslie became deathly ill while traveling from Glasgow and died at the Beechwood House.

See also 
 List of British generals

References

External links

|-

1731 births
1794 deaths
Younger sons of earls
British Army major generals
British Army personnel of the American Revolutionary War
English people of Scottish descent
North Staffordshire Regiment officers
Scots Guards officers